Miss India Worldwide 2016 was the 25th edition of the Miss India Worldwide pageant, held on 8 October 2017. The event was held at Royal Albert’s Palace in New Jersey, United States.

Stephanie Lohale of Oman crowned her successor Karina Kohli of the United States at the end of the event.

The show was hosted by Indian actor Manav Gohil and Miss India Trinidad & Tobago, Anuradha Maharaj.

Results

Special awards

Contestants 
40 contestants competed for the title of Miss India Worldwide 2016.

 – Karishma Malhotra 
 – Sukhmani khaira 
 – Zooni Thusoo 
 – Ashwani Maharaj 
 – Setphanie Madavane 
 – Mayeline Estevez
 – Indirah Mekel 
 – Brittany Singh 
 – Akila Narayanan 
 – Basanti Tak 
 – Finali Galaiya 
 – Nassima Mohamed 
 – Anne Sophie Herard 
 – Jaleela Hassennally 
 – Alisha Nanden 
 – Pooja Bhagath 
 – Kamilah Afaq 
 – Neha Gidwani
 – Krsna Priya Dasa 
 – Namita Arora 
 – Lankika Mathotaarachchi 
 – Veena Tanner 
 – Martina Mahase 
 – Sukanya Sudhakaran 
 – Jamini Patel 
 – Karina Kohli

Crossovers
Contestants who previously competed or will compete at other beauty pageants:

 – Akila Narayan has finished 1st runner-up at Miss India Teen New England 2015 and Miss Teen India USA 2015. She had completed at Miss India USA 2015 and Miss South India 2017.
 – Finali Galaiya, Miss India Wordwilde Kenya, won the title of Miss Attitude East Africa 2016 in Nairobi, Kenya.
 – Jaleela Hassennally, Miss India Worldwide Mauritius, has been conferred the title of Miss Humanity Hope 2016 by Cancer Association of Mauritius (CANMA).
 – Krsna Priya Dasa, Miss India South Africa, was previously Miss India South Africa KwaZulu-Natal 2015.
 – Namita Arora won the title of Miss India Europe 2014 in Barcelona, Spain.
 – Sukanya Sudhakaran, Miss India UAE, won the award of Miss Photogenic at Miss Kerala 2014.

References

External links
Miss India Worldwide

2016 beauty pageants
Beauty pageants in the United States